Acer Veriton series is a line of Acer PCs designed for business and professional users. The series includes several PCs with different sizes, shapes, performance and functionality. Veriton PCs come in various configurations, as well as dimensions, to cover the specific needs and demands: Micro-tower, Small Form Factor and Ultra Small Form Factor. All Acer Veriton desktop PCs labelled ‘G’ meet a variety of international standards for low energy consumption such as energy star 4.0, EPEAT Silver, RoHS and Green Seal.

Veriton N Nettop models

Veriton Desktop models

All desktop models come with integrated graphics only.

Other Veriton Desktop/Nettop models

Acer Veriton Z280G
Acer Veriton Z410G
Acer Veriton Z431G
Acer Veriton M430G
Acer Veriton M265
Acer Veriton M275
Acer Veriton X275
Acer Veriton M4630G
Acer Veriton M480G
Acer Veriton X490G
Acer Veriton M490G
Acer Veriton L480G
Acer Veriton L670G
Acer Veriton S680G
Acer Veriton M661
Acer Veriton M665
Acer Veriton M6660G | Q370H5-M6
Acer Veriton M680G
Acer Veriton M670G
Acer Veriton M68WS
Acer Veriton M67WS
Acer Veriton M421G
Acer Veriton X480G

References and notes

External links
 Acer Veriton Website 

Veriton
Business desktop computers